The Cumbo Tower, is a villa in the town of Mosta which served as a stronghold during its time. The tower is a two-storey building adorned with a niche on the main façade and surrounded by extensive gardens.

History

In the grounds of the Cumbo Tower, there is a small Christian family tomb from the Roman era. The medieval tower is said to have been owned by Julius Cumbo, a renowned criminal lawyer and state jurat of the Università of Mdina. During 1526 the tower may have played a role in the abduction of prisoners from the locality.

It served as an officers’ mess during WWII.

Nowadays, the tower hosts a reservoir belonging to Malta's Water Services Corporation which receives water from Chadwick Lakes through an underground channel.

The tower is scheduled as a grade 2 national monument by the Malta Environment and Planning Authority.

In popular culture
The tower is visible in the 2016 film 13 Hours: The Secret Soldiers of Benghazi.

Further reading
Corrupt judges in the times of the Order
Places of Interest

References

Mosta
Towers in Malta